Frank Zappa for President is a compilation album by American musician Frank Zappa, released in July 2016, consisting of unreleased compositions played on the Synclavier and unheard tracks relating to the uniting political thread that ties it all together.

Track listing

Personnel 
All titles performed/arranged/conducted by Frank Zappa

References 

Frank Zappa compilation albums
2016 compilation albums
Compilation albums published posthumously